Sega Pinball Inc. was a division of Sega which existed from 1994 until 1999. Though Sega first entered the pinball market in 1971 but stopped production in 1978. Sega re-entered the market when it took over Data East's pinball division in 1994. They produced machines under the name Sega Pinball Inc. for 5 years before leaving the market again in 1999. Sega sold all pinball assets to Gary Stern, president of the division, who then founded Stern Pinball, Inc.

Sega Pinball (1994–1999)

Pinball
Maverick (1994)
Apollo 13 (1995)
Batman Forever (1995)
Baywatch (1995)
Mary Shelley's Frankenstein (1995)
GoldenEye (1996)
Independence Day (1996)
Twister (1996)
Star Wars Trilogy (1997)
Starship Troopers (1997)
The X-Files (1997)
The Lost World: Jurassic Park (1997)
Space Jam (1998)
Godzilla (1998)
Golden Cue (1998)
Lost in Space (1998)
Viper Night Drivin' (1998)
South Park (1999)
Harley Davidson (1999)

Unreleased prototypes
Derby Daze (1996)
Roach Racers (1997)

Miscellaneous arcade machines
Cut the Cheese (1996)
Austin Powers (1997)
Udderly Tickets (1997)
Whack-A-Doodle-Doo (1998)
Titanic (1999)

Sega Enterprises Ltd. (1971–1978)

Pinball
Ali Baba
Arabian Night
Bad Cat
Big Kick
Big Together
Carnival
Cha-Cha-Cha
Crazy Clock
Explorer
Galaxy
Mikoshi
Millionaire
Miss Nessie
Monte Rosa
Nostalgia
Robin Hood
Rodeo
Sapporo
Sky Lover
Surfing
Temptation
Winner
Woman-Lib

See also
Sega, S.A. SONIC

References

External links
Sega Whitestar Pinball Hardware at System 16.com
Sega/Data East Version 3b Hardware at System 16.com
Sega Electromechanical Hardware at System 16.com
Sega Enterprises Ltd. at the Internet Pinball Machine Database
Sega Pinball Inc. at the Internet Pinball Machine Database

Pinball manufacturers
Sega pinball machines
List of Sega pinball machines
 
1994 establishments in Illinois
pinball